Christy Glacier is a steep tributary glacier draining southeast along the southwestern side of Breyer Mesa to enter Amundsen Glacier, in the Queen Maud Mountains. It was mapped by the United States Geological Survey from surveys and from U.S. Navy air photos, 1960–64, and named by the Advisory Committee on Antarctic Names for Clarence C. Christy, maintenance shop supervisor at Williams Field, McMurdo Sound, on U.S. Navy Operation Deepfreeze 1967.

References
 

Glaciers of the Ross Dependency
Amundsen Coast